Društvo nogometna šola Zavrč or simply DNŠ Zavrč is a Slovenian football club from Zavrč. As of the 2022–23 season, they play in the Slovenian Third League, the third tier of Slovenian football. The club was founded in 2016.

History
DNŠ Zavrč was founded in 2016 as the successor club of NK Zavrč, which went bankrupt during the 2016–17 season. Legally, the two clubs' records and honours are kept separate by the Football Association of Slovenia.

Stadium
Zavrč Sports Park, also known as Zavrč Stadium, is located in Zavrč. The stadium received floodlights in May 2012. However, the floodlights were removed in 2017 and sold to Aluminij due to financial problems of the club. In 2013 the stadium was completely renovated with the old stand demolished and a new main stand constructed, which opened in 2015. The stand has a seating capacity of 962.

Honours
Slovenian Fifth Division
 Winners: 2018–19

Slovenian Sixth Division
 Winners: 2017–18

Season-by-season record

References

External links
Official website 

Football clubs in Slovenia
Association football clubs established in 2016
2016 establishments in Slovenia